Laurențiu Constantin Brănescu (born 30 March 1994) is a Romanian professional footballer who plays as a goalkeeper for Greek Super League club Atromitos.

Club career

Râmnicu Vâlcea
Born in Râmnicu Vâlcea, Romania, Brănescu began his career with the youth academy of local side CSM Râmnicu Vâlcea in 2000. He remained within the club's youth sector until January 2011, when he caught the attention of Serie A side, Juventus Football Club. Brănescu originally was scouted by the Turin-based club during the summer of 2010, but did not officially complete his transfer to Italy until 24 January 2011. Prior to his transfer, the then 16-year-old made his debut for his hometown club on 28 August 2010 in a 2–0 away loss to CS Turnu Severin. He made two additional appearances for the club in the Romanian Liga II, which included a clean-sheet for the player on 20 November 2010 in a 1–0 win over ALRO Slatina.

Juventus
On 24 January 2011, Brănescu officially transferred from Râmnicu Vâlcea to Juventus Upon joining the Turin-based club, Brănescu was instantaneously inserted into the club's youth sector, where he quickly established himself as the club's first choice goalkeeper. Along with his regularity in the youth academy, Brănescu also served as Juventus' fourth choice goalkeeper for the 2012-13 Serie A campaign, behind Gianluigi Buffon, Marco Storari and Rubinho, earning 6 first team call-ups during league play, and also was a part of the club's 2012–13 UEFA Champions League roster.

Juve Stabia loan

On 2 July 2013, it was confirmed that Juventus had officially loaned the young goalkeeper to Serie B outfit S.S. Juve Stabia on a season-long loan deal with an option to prolong his tenure with the club for a further season. He made his professional debut for S.S. Juve Stabia at 11 August 2013 in the second round of the Coppa Italia against A.S. Gubbio 1910.

Virtus Lanciano loan
On 30 January 2014 Brănescu was swapped with Mame Baba Thiam of Virtus Lanciano in co-ownership deals (plus €250,000 cash to Juventus). On 19 June 2014 the deals were renewed.

On 20 January 2015 Brănescu returned to Juventus for €1.2 million (a player swap, with De Silvestro moving in the opposite direction for €1.2 million);

Other loans

Brănescu was immediately left for Szombathelyi Haladás on a temporary transfer. On 27 June 2015 Juventus accepted a loan offer for him from the Cypriot club Omonia.

In 2018 mid-year transfer window, Brănescu left for Croatian club HNK Gorica on a temporary deal. On 12 February 2019, he joined Lithuanian club Žalgiris on loan.

On 8 July 2019, he joined Scottish Premiership club Kilmarnock on a season long loan. He said he had learned a lot from Juventus goalkeeper Gianluigi Buffon and wanted to use that to become Kilmarnock's first-choice goalkeeper.

Brănescu was released by Juventus in the summer of 2020.

International career
Brănescu has represented Romania at the U-17, U19, and U-21 levels for a total of 27 caps.

Honours

Club
Juventus
Serie A: 2012–13
Supercoppa Italiana: 2012
Omonia
Cypriot Cup runner-up: 2015–16
Dinamo București
Cupa Ligii: 2016–17
Žalgiris
Lithuanian Supercup runner-up: 2019

References

External links

Profile at UEFA

1994 births
Living people
Sportspeople from Râmnicu Vâlcea
Romanian footballers
Association football goalkeepers
Serie B players
Nemzeti Bajnokság I players
Liga I players
Liga II players
SCM Râmnicu Vâlcea players
Juventus F.C. players
S.S. Juve Stabia players
S.S. Virtus Lanciano 1924 players
Szombathelyi Haladás footballers
AC Omonia players
FC Dinamo București players
HNK Gorica players
FK Žalgiris players
Kilmarnock F.C. players
FC Politehnica Iași (2010) players
FCV Farul Constanța players
FC Universitatea Cluj players
Atromitos F.C. players
Croatian Football League players
Cypriot First Division players
A Lyga players
Scottish Professional Football League players
Super League Greece players
Romanian expatriate footballers
Expatriate footballers in Italy
Expatriate footballers in Hungary
Expatriate footballers in Cyprus
Expatriate footballers in Croatia
Expatriate footballers in Lithuania
Expatriate footballers in Scotland
Expatriate footballers in Greece
Romanian expatriate sportspeople in Italy
Romanian expatriate sportspeople in Hungary
Romanian expatriate sportspeople in Cyprus
Romanian expatriate sportspeople in Croatia
Romanian expatriate sportspeople in Lithuania
Romanian expatriate sportspeople in Scotland
Romanian expatriate sportspeople in Greece
Romania under-21 international footballers
Romania youth international footballers